Corporate welfare is a phrase used to describe a government's bestowal of money grants, tax breaks, or other special favorable treatment for corporations.

The definition of corporate welfare is sometimes restricted to direct government subsidies of major corporations, excluding tax loopholes and all manner of regulatory and trade decisions.

Origin of term 
The term "corporate welfare" was reportedly coined in 1956 by Ralph Nader.

Alternative adages

"Socialism for the rich, capitalism for the poor" 

Believed to have been first popularised by Michael Harrington's 1962 book The Other America in which Harrington cited Charles Abrams, a noted authority on housing.

Variations on this adage have been used in criticisms of the United States' economic policy by Joe Biden, Martin Luther King Jr., Gore Vidal, Joseph P. Kennedy II, Robert F. Kennedy, Jr., Dean Baker, Noam Chomsky, Robert Reich, John Pilger, Bernie Sanders, and Yanis Varoufakis.

"Privatizing profits and socializing losses" 
"Privatizing profits and socializing losses" refers to the idea that corporations want to reserve financial gains for themselves and pass along losses to the rest of society, potentially through lobbying the government for assistance. This practice was criticized in the Wall Street bailout of 2008.

By country

United States

Background 
Subsidies considered excessive, unwarranted, wasteful, unfair, inefficient, or bought by lobbying are often called corporate welfare. The label of corporate welfare is often used to decry projects advertised as benefiting the general welfare that spend a disproportionate amount of funds on large corporations, and often in uncompetitive, or anti-competitive ways. For instance, in the United States, agricultural subsidies are usually portrayed as helping independent farmers stay afloat. However, the majority of income gained from commodity support programs actually goes to large agribusiness corporations such as Archer Daniels Midland, as they own a considerably larger percentage of production.

Alan Peters and Peter Fisher, Associate Professors at the University of Iowa, have estimated that state and local governments provide $40–50 billion annually in economic development incentives, which critics characterize as corporate welfare.

Some economists consider the 2008 bank bailouts in the United States to be corporate welfare. U.S. politicians have also contended that zero-interest loans from the Federal Reserve System to financial institutions during and after the financial crisis of 2007–2008 were a hidden, backdoor form of corporate welfare. The term gained increased prominence in 2018 when Senator Bernie Sanders introduced a bill, singling out Amazon and Walmart in particular, to require a company with 500 or more employees to pay the full cost of welfare benefits received by its workers.

Comprehensive analyses

Independent 
Daniel D. Huff, professor emeritus of social work at Boise State University, published a comprehensive analysis of corporate welfare in 1993. Huff reasoned that a very conservative estimate of corporate welfare expenditures in the United States would have been at least  in 1990. Huff compared this number with social welfare:

Huff argued that deliberate obfuscation was a complicating factor.

Good Jobs First has a Subsidy Tracker database.

United Kingdom 
In 2015, Kevin Farnsworth, a senior lecturer in Social Policy at the University of York published a paper in which he claimed that the government was providing corporate subsidies of £93 billion. This amount includes the role of the government in increasing trade, tax relief for businesses that invest in new plants and machinery (estimated by Farnsworth at £20 billion), not charging fuel duty on fuel used by railways or airlines, green energy subsidies, a lower corporation tax rate for small companies, regional development grants and government procurement for businesses (which Farnsworth suggests often favours British businesses even when these are not the best value option available). However, The Register wrote that Farnsworth's figure for tax relief for investment was incorrect and that he had made mistakes in his calculations, noting that he was not an accountant. It also stated that not charging businesses taxes under certain circumstances (when the reliefs applied) was not the same as giving them a subsidy. Fuel duty is not charged on airlines due to the Convention on International Civil Aviation (a UN agency) which specifies that aeroplanes should be exempt from fuel duties.

Political discussion 
In 2015, Labour Party leader Jeremy Corbyn said he would "strip out" the £93bn of "corporate tax relief and subsidies" Farnsworth referred to and use the proceeds for public investment. Corbyn did not say which specific policies he would change. The Guardian wrote the policy "sounds wonderful, but careful scrutiny of 'corporate welfare' shows that it includes capital allowances designed to persuade companies to invest, regional aid to boost growth in rundown parts of the UK, and subsidies to keep bus and rail routes open – none of which Corbyn would presumably like to see stopped."

Canada 
The New Democratic Party in Canada picked up the term as a major theme in its 1972 federal election campaign. Its leader, David Lewis, used the term in the title of his 1972 book, Louder Voices: The Corporate Welfare Bums.

The Reform Party and its successor the Canadian Alliance were known for opposing most business subsidies, but after their merger with the Progressive Conservative party, they dropped their opposition.

India 
It was observed by The Wire that the effective tax rate was low for the larger corporations which meant companies making smaller profits are competing in an unequal environment against bigger companies with substantial taxation benefits, with the gap in effective tax rates widening over the years. Prime Minister of India Narendra Modi criticised this practice and said

See also 

 Corporate Welfare: Where’s the Outrage? – A Personal Exploration by Johan Norberg
 Crony capitalism
 Corporatocracy
 Fossil fuel subsidies
 Kleptocracy
 Political corruption
 Pork barrel
 Public choice theory
 Regulatory capture

References

Further reading 
 Johnston, David Cay. Free Lunch (The Penguin Group, New York, 2007.)
 Jansson, Bruce S. The $16 trillion mistake: How the U.S. bungled its national priorities from the New Deal to the present (Columbia University Press, 2001)
 Mandell, Nikki. The corporation as family : the gendering of corporate welfare, 1890-1930 (University of North Carolina Press, 2002).
 Glasberg, Davita Silfen. Corporate welfare policy and the welfare state: Bank deregulation and the savings and loan bailout (Aldine de Gruyter, NY, 1997).
 Whitfield, Dexter. Public services or corporate welfare: Rethinking the nation state in the global economy (Pluto Press, Sterling, Va., 2001.)
 Folsom Jr, Burton W. The Myth of the Robber Barons (Young America)
 Rothbard, Murray N. Making Economic Sense, Chapter 51: Making Government-Business Partnerships  (1995)

External links 

 Anti-subsidy Congressional testimony
 Articles & sources from an anti-subsidy perspective
 Anti-subsidy information from NewRules.org
 A corporate welfare example from N.Y.
 A pro-subsidy perspective
 Interview with Samuel Edward Konkin III - 3 types of capitalists, categorizes State support of businesses as dangerous

Business terms
Political terminology of the United States
Politics by issue
Subsidies
Fiscal policy
Welfare
Ralph Nader